The 2013 Nordic Futsal Championship, was the Third edition of the Nordic Futsal Championship hosted by Stockholm, Sweden.

Final standings

Matches and results

Awards

 Winner:  Ilves
 Runners-up:  Vegakameratene
 Third-Place:  Jægersborg Futsal Gentofte
 Top scorer:
 Best Player:

References

External links
 Futsal Planet

2013
2013–14 in European futsal
2013
2013 in Swedish football
International sports competitions in Stockholm
2010s in Stockholm